Optimizm (Optimism) is the second studio album by Soviet/Russian punk band Grazhdanskaya Oborona. The album was released in 1985 and was recorded concurrently with its follow-up Poganaya molodyozh'.

The original versions of Poganaya molodezh and Optimizm were recorded in 1984 with Egor Letov and Konstantin Ryabinov (Kuzya UO, Кузя УО) and intended to be a Posev album. According to Letov, the two albums represented two parts of one big release and published together on a single tape. This tape was produced under the title "Grazhdanskaya Oborona" or "GO-85". The album was recorded in 1984/1985, but was re-recorded in 1988 by E. Letov and Kuzya Uo. Participants in the recording of the album in 1985 was Andrey Babenko (Boss), Oleg Ivanovsky and Valery Rozhkov, who played the flute in the song "Optimizm".

The album is lighter and more lyrical in comparison with the debut album and made in the genre of post-punk and garage rock. The song "Sobaka", "Na nashikh glazakh" and 
"Optimizm" was played in the genre reggae and folk. Songs of this album were composed by Letov and Kuzya Uo back in the band «Posev» in 1983. Subsequently, these songs were re-recorded and included in the compilation of Grazhdansakaya Oborona "Posey" in 1989.

The album had no cover until the 1999 release on XOP, because it was originally distributed via magnitizdat. The basis for the album cover went the figure of Yegor Letov drawn specially for the cover of the album in 1985.

Track listing

Personnel 
 Yegor Letov – vocals, guitars, bass guitar, drums, production
 Konstantin Ryabinov (Kuzya UO) – vocals, guitars, bass guitar
 Valery Rozhkov  – flute («Optimizm»)

External links 
 Optimizm at Discogs (list of versions)
 Album on official site

1985 albums
Grazhdanskaya Oborona albums